Cecil (Japanese: セシル, stylized as CECIL) is a Japanese pop music group, best known for their song, "Super Shomin Car" appearing in the film Kamikaze Girls.

While the band has never formally disbanded, no activity from the band has taken place since 2006.

Band members
 - Songwriting and vocals
Batayam - Lyrics and artwork
 - Illustration and design.
 - Kanbara Kunie's sister.
 - Composition, arrangement, guitar and bass.
 - Keyboard, Drum
 - Recording engineer.

Discography

Albums
Natsudokei (夏時計) (August 10, 2000)
Rikka (December 8, 2000)
Cheek (October 26, 2001)
Natsudokei (夏時計) -2002 ENCORE EDITION- (July 19, 2002)
CECILMANIA#203 (July 19, 2002)
CINEMA SCOPE (February 13, 2003)
Taigā Riryi (タイガー・リリィ) (March 24, 2004)

Singles
Super "shomin" car (23 April 2003)
Namida no Tsubomi (涙の蕾) (2005)

Online Releases
Furūtsu Basuketto (フルーツバスケット) (2006)
Yakan Hikō (夜間飛行) (2006)

References

Japanese pop music groups
Musical groups established in 2000
Musical groups disestablished in 2006
Japanese pop rock music groups